Nemesis Fighting: MMA Global Invasion was a mixed martial arts event promoted by Nemesis Fighting. It was originally scheduled to take place on November 13, 2010  in Punta Cana, La Altagracia.

Controversy

The event was postponed to avoid a storm the new date for the event being December 10, 2010.  The company also promised a "live" internet stream of the fights on December 13, 2010 but that did not happen.

The event has been marred by accusations that fighters were not compensated.

Keith Jardine has been accused of greasing in the fight, they had no judges and the time for the rounds were kept by a mobile phone.

John Dodson claimed his fight with John Moraga lasted 17 or 18 minutes.  “It was unorganized," said Dodson. "They didn’t have anything well put together.”

The promotion reportedly owed at least $233,000 which was never paid. The case has been taken up by the U.S. Secret Service.

Nemesis Fight Promotions has not hosted an event since and their website has been suspended.

Results

References

Mixed martial arts events
2010 in mixed martial arts
Mixed martial arts in the Dominican Republic
Sport in La Altagracia Province
2010 in Dominican Republic sport